The 2018 presidential campaign of Guilherme Boulos was announced on 3 March 2018 in São Paulo. Guilherme Boulos, a nationally-recognized leader of the Homeless Workers' Movement (MTST), ran as a member of the left-wing Socialism and Liberty Party.

For the position of Vice President, Boulos chose Sônia Guajajara, an indigenous activist and former competitor for the PSOL presidential nomination, as his running mate. On 20 July, a day before PSOL national convention, the Brazilian Communist Party (PCB) confirmed their support to PSOL in the presidential election.

Candidates

Election result

Presidential elections

Endorsements
Actor Wagner Moura.
Actor Gregório Duvivier.
Cartoonist Laerte.

References

2018 Brazilian general election
2018 Brazilian presidential campaigns
Socialism and Liberty Party